The 1917 Montana football team represented the University of Montana in the 1917 college football season. They were led by third-year head coach Jerry Nissen, played their home games at Dornblaser Field, and finished the season with a record of one win and four losses (1–4).

The Spokesman-Review (of Spokane, Washington) referred to the team as the "Grizzlies" in its November 18 edition.

Schedule

 One game was played on Thursday (against Idaho on Thanksgiving)

References

Montana
Montana Grizzlies football seasons
Montana football